This is a list of the Dutch Top 40 number-one singles of 2020. The Dutch Top 40 is a chart that ranks the best-performing singles of the Netherlands. It is published every week by radio station Qmusic.

Chart history

Number-one artists

See also
2020 in music

References

Number-one singles
Netherlands
2020